is a Japanese politician who has held multiple different cabinet posts. He is a former member of the Liberal Democratic Party (LDP), and was co-president of Nippon Ishin no Kai (Japanese: Japan Restoration Party; JPR) alongside Ichirō Matsui from 2016 to 2021.

Early life and education
Katayama was born in Okayama Prefecture on 2 August 1935. He graduated from the University of Tokyo's faculty of law in March 1958.

Career
Katayama began his career at the agency of Home Affairs in April 1958. He became vice governor of Okayama Prefecture in April 1985. He was elected to the House of Councilors in July 1989, being a member of the LDP. He was elected to the House for the second term in July 1995, for the third term in July 2001 and for the fourth term in July 2001.

In the LDP, Katayama was part of the faction headed by Ryutaro Hashimoto and then of the Tsushima faction at the beginning of the 2002s.

After holding different roles in the House, he was appointed minister of posts and telecommunications, minister of home affairs, and also, director-general of the management and coordination agency in December 2000. In January 2001, Katayama was named as the minister for public management, home affairs, posts and telecommunications. On 8 February 2002, Katayama was appointed minister of public management in the cabinet headed by Prime Minister Junichiro Koizumi. He retained his post in the cabinet reshuffle on 8 December 2002. Later he became secretary general of the LDP in the upper house in July 2004. Until 2007 Katayama was the number two or deputy leader of the party's upper house group and also, the leader of its campaign strategy. Katayama lost his seat in the upper house in the 2007 election.

Katayama left the LDP when the party set an age limit of 70 for candidates in the House of Councillors proportional representation bloc election in 2010. As a result, he joined the now-defunct Tachiagare Nippon. He was reelected to the upper house for the fifth term in July 2010 for the Tachiagare Nippon. He was also the secretary-general of the House of Councillors of the party. Next he became a member of the JPR, which was led jointly by Tōru Hashimoto and Shintaro Ishihara. He began to represent the party at the House and is a member of the House's committee on general affairs.

After the JRP disbanded, he joined the Japan Innovation Party. On 2 September 2015, he joined Initiatives from Osaka.

References

External links

1935 births
Government ministers of Japan
Japan Restoration Party politicians
Japan Innovation Party politicians
Liberal Democratic Party (Japan) politicians
Living people
Ministers of Internal Affairs of Japan
Nippon Ishin no Kai politicians
People from Okayama Prefecture
Sunrise Party politicians
University of Tokyo alumni